Cabana, cabanas or cabañas may refer to:

Cabana (structure), either a small hut built with a thatched roof, or a recreational structure with at least one wall open at a beachside or poolside club

Places
 Cabana, Peru, capital of the Cabana District in Ancash, Peru
 Cabanas, Galicia, a municipality in A Coruña, Galicia, Spain
 Cabanas, Girona, a municipality in Alt Empordà, Girona, Catalonia, Spain
 Cabañas, Cuba, a town in Artemisa Province of Cuba
 Cabañas, Copán, a municipality in Honduras
 Cabañas, La Paz, a municipality in Honduras
 Cabañas, Zacapa, Guatemala
 Cabana de Bergantiños, Galicia, Spain
 Cabana District (Ancash), Pallasca Province, Ancash Region, Peru
 Cabanas de Tavira, a town in Algarve, Portugal
 Cabanas de Torres, a freguesia in Alenquer, Portugal
 Cabanas de Viriato, a town in Portugal
 Cabañas Department, El Salvador
 Cabanas Island, Portugal; see List of islands of Portugal
 Las Cabañas de Castilla, Spain
 Cabana (ancient lake), in the Altiplano of South America

People
Anna Cabana (born 1979), French journalist
Colt Cabana, ring name of American professional wrestler Scott Colton (born 1980)
Dario Xoan Cabana, Galician writer of Galician-language literature
Frédérik Cabana (born 1986), ice hockey player
Hubert-Charron Cabana (1838–1901), Canadian politician
Jean-Paul Cabana, Canadian race car driver
José Trinidad Cabañas (1805–1871), president of Honduras
Lucio Cabañas (1938–1974), Mexican revolutionary
Ricardo Cabanas (born 1979), Swiss football (soccer) player
Robert D. Cabana (born 1949), US astronaut
Salvador Cabañas (born 1980), Paraguayan football (soccer) player

Other
Cabana (passenger train); see list of named passenger trains of the United States (C)
Cabana (chocolate bar), a defunct British brand
Cabañas (cigar brand), a Cuban cigar brand; see list of cigar brands
La Cabaña, a fortress / prison / museum in Cuba
Taco Cabana, a U.S. fast food restaurant chain
USS Cabana (DE-260), a U.S. warship
A type of dry sausage, also known as Cabanossi

See also
 Cabin (disambiguation)
 Cabanes (disambiguation)
 Cabanès (disambiguation)
 Cabannes (disambiguation)
 Kibana, software